Talma may refer to:

People 
Brian Talma (born 1965), Barbadian sailor, windsurfer, and Olympics competitor
César Talma (born 1980), Chilean footballer
Elke Talma (born 1977), Seychellois swimmer and Olympics competitor
François-Joseph Talma (1763–1826), French actor; husband of Julie Talma
Gábor Talmácsi (nickname "Talma"; born 1981), Hungarian motorcycle racer
Julie Talma (1756–1805), French dancer, courtesan, and salon-holder; wife of François-Joseph Talma
Louise Talma (1906–1996), French-born US classical composer, academic, and pianist
Mary Ann Ford (stage-name Talma; 1861–1944), British stage magician with "Le Roy, Talma & Bosco"; husband of Servais Le Roy [see: Talma (magician)]
Meindert Talma (born 1968), Dutch singer and keyboardist for the band Meindert Talma & the Negroes
Syb Talma (1864–1916), Dutch politician

Places 
Talma, Indiana, a US unincorporated community
, a small ski resort in Finland
Talma (village), a small village in Sipoo, Finland

Animals 
Eastern Talma, a common name of the butterflyfish species Chelmonops truncatus
Western Talma, a common name of the butterflyfish species Chelmonops curiosus
Talma (horse), won the St. Leger Stakes in 1951

See also
Telma (disambiguation)